Spintharus leonardodicaprioi is a species of theridiid spider. It is found in the Dominican Republic and was named after the actor Leonardo DiCaprio for his environmental activism. It was named alongside several other Spintharus species whose specific epithets honored celebrities, and it received media coverage from around the world due to its name.

See also
 List of organisms named after famous people (born 1950–present)
 Grouvellinus leonardodicaprioi, a beetle named after DiCaprio

References

External links

 

Spiders described in 2018
Arthropods of the Dominican Republic
Theridiidae
Leonardo DiCaprio
Spiders of the Caribbean